Saint-Vivien  may refer to the following places in France:

Saint-Vivien, Charente-Maritime, a commune in the Charente-Maritime département 
Saint-Vivien, La Garde, a former commune in the Charente-Maritime département that is now a part of Montlieu-la-Garde
Saint-Vivien, Dordogne, a commune in the Dordogne département 
Saint-Vivien, Paussac, a former commune in the Dordogne département that is now a part of Paussac-et-Saint-Vivien
Saint-Vivien-de-Blaye, in the Gironde département 
Saint-Vivien-de-Médoc, in the Gironde département
Saint-Vivien-de-Monségur, in the Gironde département

See also
Saint Vivianus (died c. 490)
Saint Vivian (disambiguation)